"Puss in Boots" is a European fairy tale about an  anthropomorphic cat who uses trickery and deceit to gain power, wealth, and the hand in marriage of a princess for his penniless and low-born master.

The oldest written telling version is Costantino Fortunato (Italian for "Lucky Costantino") by Italian author Giovanni Francesco Straparola, included in The Facetious Nights of Straparola (c. 1550–1553), in which the cat is a fairy in disguise who helps his owner, a poor boy named Costantino, to gain his princess by duping a king, a lord and many commoners. There is a version written by Girolamo Morlini, from whom Straparola used various tales in The Facetious Nights; another version was published in 1634 by Giambattista Basile with the title Cagliuso. The most popular version of the tale was written in French at the close of the seventeenth century by Charles Perrault (1628–1703), a retired civil servant and member of the Académie française. Perrault's tale appeared in a handwritten and illustrated manuscript two years before its 1697 publication by Barbin in a collection of eight fairy tales by Perrault called Histoires ou contes du temps passé. The book was an instant success and remains popular.

Perrault's Histoires has had considerable impact on world culture. The frontispiece to the earliest English editions depicts an old woman telling tales to a group of children beneath a placard inscribed "MOTHER GOOSE'S TALES" and is credited with launching the Mother Goose legend in the English-speaking world. "Puss in Boots" has provided inspiration for composers, choreographers, and other artists over the centuries. The cat appears in the third act pas de caractère of Tchaikovsky's ballet The Sleeping Beauty. Puss in Boots appears in DreamWorks' Shrek franchise, appearing in all three sequels to the original film, as well as two spin-off films, Puss in Boots (2011) and Puss in Boots: The Last Wish (2022), where he is voiced by Antonio Banderas. The character is signified in the logo of Japanese anime studio Toei Animation, and is also a popular pantomime in the UK.

Plot
The Perrault's tale opens with the third and youngest son of a miller receiving his inheritance - a cat.  At first, the youngest son laments, as the eldest brother gains their father's mill, and the middle brother gets the mule-and-cart. However, the feline is no ordinary cat, but one who requests and receives a pair of boots. Determined to make his master's fortune, the cat bags a rabbit in the forest and presents it to the king as a gift from his master, the fictional Marquis of Carabas. The cat continues making gifts of game to the king for several months, for which he is rewarded.

One day, the king decides to take a drive with his daughter. The cat persuades his master to remove his clothes and enter the river which their carriage passes. The cat disposes of his master's clothing beneath a rock. As the royal coach nears, the cat begins calling for help in great distress. When the king stops to investigate, the cat tells him that his master the Marquis has been bathing in the river and robbed of his clothing. The king has the young man brought from the river, dressed in a splendid suit of clothes, and seated in the coach with his daughter, who falls in love with him at once.

The cat hurries ahead of the coach, ordering the country folk along the road to tell the king that the land belongs to the "Marquis of Carabas", saying that if they do not he will cut them into mincemeat. The cat then happens upon a castle inhabited by an ogre who is capable of transforming himself into a number of creatures. The ogre displays his ability by changing into a lion, frightening the cat, who then tricks the ogre into changing into a mouse. The cat then pounces upon the mouse and devours it. The king arrives at the castle that formerly belonged to the ogre, and impressed with the bogus Marquis and his estate, gives the lad the princess in marriage. Thereafter; the cat enjoys life as a great lord who runs after mice only for his own amusement.

The tale is followed immediately by two morals; "one stresses the importance of possessing industrie and savoir faire while the other extols the virtues of dress, countenance, and youth to win the heart of a princess". The Italian translation by Carlo Collodi notes that the tale gives useful advice if you happen to be a cat or a Marquis of Carabas.

This is the theme in France, but other versions of this theme exist in Asia, Africa, and South America.

Background

Perrault's the "Master Cat or Puss in Boots" is the most renowned tale in all of Western folklore of the animal as helper. However, the trickster cat did not originate with Perrault. Centuries before the publication of Perrault's tale, Somadeva, a Kashmir Brahmin, assembled a vast collection of Indian folk tales called Kathā Sarit Sāgara (lit. "The ocean of the streams of stories") that featured stock fairy tale characters and trappings such as invincible swords, vessels that replenish their contents, and helpful animals. In the Panchatantra (lit. "Five Principles"), a collection of Hindu tales from the second century BC., a tale follows a cat who fares much less well than Perrault's Puss as he attempts to make his fortune in a king's palace.

In 1553, "Costantino Fortunato", a tale similar to "Le Maître Chat", was published in Venice in Giovanni Francesco Straparola's Le Piacevoli Notti (lit. The Facetious Nights), the first European storybook to include fairy tales. In Straparola's tale however, the poor young man is the son of a Bohemian woman, the cat is a fairy in disguise, the princess is named Elisetta, and the castle belongs not to an ogre but to a lord who conveniently perishes in an accident. The poor young man eventually becomes King of Bohemia. An edition of Straparola was published in France in 1560. The abundance of oral versions after Straparola's tale may indicate an oral source to the tale; it also is possible Straparola invented the story.

In 1634, another tale with a trickster cat as hero was published in Giambattista Basile's collection Pentamerone although neither the collection nor the tale were published in France during Perrault's lifetime. In Basile's version, the lad is a beggar boy called Gagliuso (sometimes Cagliuso) whose fortunes are achieved in a manner similar to Perrault's Puss. However, the tale ends with Cagliuso, in gratitude to the cat, promising the feline a gold coffin upon his death. Three days later, the cat decides to test Gagliuso by pretending to be dead and is mortified to hear Gagliuso tell his wife to take the dead cat by its paws and throw it out the window. The cat leaps up, demanding to know whether this was his promised reward for helping the beggar boy to a better life. The cat then rushes away, leaving his master to fend for himself. In another rendition, the cat performs acts of bravery, then a fairy comes and turns him to his normal state to be with other cats.

It is likely that Perrault was aware of the Straparola tale, since 'Facetious Nights' was translated into French in the sixteenth century and subsequently passed into the oral tradition.

Publication

The oldest record of written history was published in Venice by the Italian author Giovanni Francesco Straparola in his The Facetious Nights of Straparola (c. 1550–53) in XIV-XV. His original title was Costantino Fortunato (lit. Lucky Costantino).
 
The story was published under the French title Le Maître Chat, ou le Chat Botté ('Master Cat, or the Booted Cat') by Barbin in Paris in January 1697 in a collection of tales called Histoires ou contes du temps passé. The collection included "La Belle au bois dormant" ("The Sleeping Beauty in the Wood"), "Le petit chaperon rouge" ("Little Red Riding Hood"), "La Barbe bleue" ("Blue Beard"), "Les Fées" ("The Enchanted Ones", or "Diamonds and Toads"), "Cendrillon, ou la petite pantoufle de verre" ("Cinderella, or The Little Glass Slipper"), "Riquet à la Houppe" ("Riquet with the Tuft"), and "Le Petit Poucet" ("Hop o' My Thumb"). The book displayed a frontispiece depicting an old woman telling tales to a group of three children beneath a placard inscribed "CONTES DE MA MERE L'OYE" (Tales of Mother Goose). The book was an instant success.

Le Maître Chat first was translated into English as "The Master Cat, or Puss in Boots" by Robert Samber in 1729 and published in London for J. Pote and R. Montagu with its original companion tales in Histories, or Tales of Past Times, By M. Perrault. The book was advertised in June 1729 as being "very entertaining and instructive for children". A frontispiece similar to that of the first French edition appeared in the English edition launching the Mother Goose legend in the English-speaking world. Samber's translation has been described as "faithful and straightforward, conveying attractively the concision, liveliness and gently ironic tone of Perrault's prose, which itself emulated the direct approach of oral narrative in its elegant simplicity." Since that publication, the tale has been translated into various languages and published around the world.

Question of authorship
Perrault's son Pierre Darmancour was assumed to have been responsible for the authorship of Histoires with the evidence cited being the book's dedication to Élisabeth Charlotte d'Orléans, the youngest niece of Louis XIV, which was signed "P. Darmancour". Perrault senior, however, was known for some time to have been interested in contes de veille or contes de ma mère l'oye, and in 1693 published a versification of "Les Souhaits Ridicules" and, in 1694, a tale with a Cinderella theme called "Peau d'Ane". Further, a handwritten and illustrated manuscript of five of the tales (including Le Maistre Chat ou le Chat Botté) existed two years before the tale's 1697 Paris publication.

Pierre Darmancour was sixteen or seventeen years old at the time the manuscript was prepared and, as scholars Iona and Peter Opie note, quite unlikely to have been interested in recording fairy tales. Darmancour, who became a soldier, showed no literary inclinations, and, when he died in 1700, his obituary made no mention of any connection with the tales. However, when Perrault senior died in 1703, the newspaper alluded to his being responsible for "La Belle au bois dormant", which the paper had published in 1696.

Analysis
In folkloristics, Puss in Boots is classified as Aarne–Thompson–Uther ATU 545B, "Puss in Boots", a subtype of ATU 545, "The Cat as Helper". Folklorists Joseph Jacobs and Stith Thompson point that the Perrault's tale is the possible source of the Cat Helper story in later European folkloric traditions. The tale has also spread to the Americas, and is known in Asia (India, Indonesia and Philippines).

Variations of the feline helper across cultures replace the cat with a jackal or fox. For instance, the helpful animal is a monkey "in all Philippine variants" according to Damiana Eugenio.

Greek scholar Marianthi Kaplanoglou states that the tale type ATU 545B, "Puss in Boots" (or, locally, "The Helpful Fox"), is an "example" of "widely known stories (...) in the repertoires of Greek refugees from Asia Minor".

Adaptations

Perrault's tale has been adapted to various media over the centuries. Ludwig Tieck published a dramatic satire based on the tale, called Der gestiefelte Kater, and, in 1812, the Brothers Grimm inserted a version of the tale into their Kinder- und Hausmärchen. In ballet, Puss appears in the third act of Tchaikovsky's The Sleeping Beauty in a pas de caractère with The White Cat.

The phrase "enough to make a cat laugh" dates from the mid-1800s and is associated with the tale of Puss in Boots.

The Bibliothèque de Carabas book series was published by David Nutt in London in the late 19th century, in which the front cover of each volume depicts Puss in Boots reading a book.

In film and television, Walt Disney produced an animated black and white silent short based on the tale in 1922.

Commentaries
Jacques Barchilon and Henry Pettit note in their introduction to The Authentic Mother Goose: Fairy Tales and Nursery Rhymes that the main motif of "Puss in Boots" is the animal as helper and that the tale "carries atavistic memories of the familiar totem animal as the father protector of the tribe found everywhere by missionaries and anthropologists." They also note that the title is original with Perrault as are the boots; no tale prior to Perrault's features a cat wearing boots.

Folklorists Iona and Peter Opie observe that "the tale is unusual in that the hero little deserves his good fortune, that is if his poverty, his being a third child, and his unquestioning acceptance of the cat's sinful instructions, are not nowadays looked upon as virtues." The cat should be acclaimed the prince of 'con' artists, they declare, as few swindlers have been so successful before or since.

The success of Histoires is attributed to seemingly contradictory and incompatible reasons. While the literary skill employed in the telling of the tales has been recognized universally, it appears the tales were set down in great part as the author heard them told. The evidence for that assessment lies first in the simplicity of the tales, then in the use of words that were, in Perrault's era, considered populaire and du bas peuple, and finally, in the appearance of vestigial passages that now are superfluous to the plot, do not illuminate the narrative, and thus, are passages the Opies believe a literary artist would have rejected in the process of creating a work of art. One such vestigial passage is Puss's boots; his insistence upon the footwear is explained nowhere in the tale, it is not developed, nor is it referred to after its first mention except in an aside.

According to the Opies, Perrault's great achievement was accepting fairy tales at "their own level." He recounted them with neither impatience nor mockery, and without feeling that they needed any aggrandisement such as a frame story—although he must have felt it useful to end with a rhyming moralité. Perrault would be revered today as the father of folklore if he had taken the time to record where he obtained his tales, when, and under what circumstances.

Bruno Bettelheim remarks that "the more simple and straightforward a good character in a fairy tale, the easier it is for a child to identify with it and to reject the bad other." The child identifies with a good hero because the hero's condition makes a positive appeal to him. If the character is a very good person, then the child is likely to want to be good too. Amoral tales, however, show no polarization or juxtaposition of good and bad persons because amoral tales such as "Puss in Boots" build character, not by offering choices between good and bad, but by giving the child hope that even the meekest can survive. Morality is of little concern in these tales, but rather, an assurance is provided that one can survive and succeed in life.

Small children can do little on their own and may give up in disappointment and despair with their attempts. Fairy stories, however, give great dignity to the smallest achievements (such as befriending an animal or being befriended by an animal, as in "Puss in Boots") and that such ordinary events may lead to great things. Fairy stories encourage children to believe and trust that their small, real achievements are important although perhaps not recognized at the moment.

In Fairy Tales and the Art of Subversion Jack Zipes notes that Perrault "sought to portray ideal types to reinforce the standards of the civilizing process set by upper-class French society". A composite portrait of Perrault's heroines, for example, reveals the author's idealized female of upper-class society is graceful, beautiful, polite, industrious, well groomed, reserved, patient, and even somewhat stupid because for Perrault, intelligence in womankind would be threatening. Therefore, Perrault's composite heroine passively waits for "the right man" to come along, recognize her virtues, and make her his wife. He acts, she waits. If his seventeenth century heroines demonstrate any characteristics, it is submissiveness.

A composite of Perrault's male heroes, however, indicates the opposite of his heroines: his male characters are not particularly handsome, but they are active, brave, ambitious, and deft, and they use their wit, intelligence, and great civility to work their way up the social ladder and to achieve their goals. In this case of course, it is the cat who displays the characteristics and the man benefits from his trickery and skills. Unlike the tales dealing with submissive heroines waiting for marriage, the male-centered tales suggest social status and achievement are more important than marriage for men. The virtues of Perrault's heroes reflect upon the bourgeoisie of the court of Louis XIV and upon the nature of Perrault, who was a successful civil servant in France during the seventeenth century.

According to fairy and folk tale researcher and commentator Jack Zipes, Puss is "the epitome of the educated bourgeois secretary who serves his master with complete devotion and diligence." The cat has enough wit and manners to impress the king, the intelligence to defeat the ogre, and the skill to arrange a royal marriage for his low-born master. Puss's career is capped by his elevation to grand seigneur and the tale is followed by a double moral: "one stresses the importance of possessing industrie et savoir faire while the other extols the virtues of dress, countenance, and youth to win the heart of a princess."

The renowned illustrator of Dickens' novels and stories, George Cruikshank, was shocked that parents would allow their children to read "Puss in Boots" and declared: "As it stood the tale was a succession of successful falsehoods—a clever lesson in lying!—a system of imposture rewarded with the greatest worldly advantages."

Another critic, Maria Tatar, notes that there is little to admire in Puss—he threatens, flatters, deceives, and steals in order to promote his master. She further observes that Puss has been viewed as a "linguistic virtuoso", a creature who has mastered the arts of persuasion and rhetoric to acquire power and wealth.

"Puss in Boots" has successfully supplanted its antecedents by Straparola and Basile and the tale has altered the shapes of many older oral trickster cat tales where they still are found. The morals Perrault attached to the tales are either at odds with the narrative, or beside the point. The first moral tells the reader that hard work and ingenuity are preferable to inherited wealth, but the moral is belied by the poor miller's son who neither works nor uses his wit to gain worldly advantage, but marries into it through trickery performed by the cat. The second moral stresses womankind's vulnerability to external appearances: fine clothes and a pleasant visage are enough to win their hearts. In an aside, Tatar suggests that if the tale has any redeeming meaning, "it has something to do with inspiring respect for those domestic creatures that hunt mice and look out for their masters."

Briggs does assert that cats were a form of fairy in their own right having something akin to a fairy court and their own set of magical powers. Still, it is rare in Europe's fairy tales for a cat to be so closely involved with human affairs. According to Jacob Grimm, Puss shares many of the features that a household fairy or deity would have including a desire for boots which could represent seven-league boots. This may mean that the story of "Puss and Boots" originally represented the tale of a family deity aiding an impoverished family member.

Stefan Zweig, in his 1939 novel, Ungeduld des Herzens, references Puss in Boots' procession through a rich and varied countryside with his master and drives home his metaphor with a mention of Seven League Boots.

References
Notes

Footnotes

Works cited

Further reading

External links

 Origin of the Story of 'Puss in Boots'
 "Puss in Boots"  – English translation from The Blue Fairy Book (1889)
 "Puss in Boots" – Beautifully illustrated in The Colorful Story Book (1941)
 

1697 short stories
European fairy tales
Grimms' Fairy Tales
Cats in literature
French fairy tales
Italian fairy tales
Works by Charles Perrault
European folklore characters
Characters in fairy tales
Fictional marquesses and marchionesses
Fictional tricksters
Anthropomorphic cats
ATU 500-559